The New Zealand Army Band is a brass band that primarily provides musical support for the New Zealand Army at all state and ceremonial occasions. It was founded in 1964 by Captain James Donald Carson (1935–2008) of the Royal New Zealand Infantry Regiment.

It is based out of Burnham Camp, which is the largest army base on the South Island. Presently, the New Zealand Army Band and the Officer Cadet School are the only units of the New Zealand Army that employ scarlet tunics as part of their full dress uniforms. The Campaign hat is also used as headgear for the band. 35-members strong, it includes a parade band, a concert band as well as rhythm sections and a vocalist.

The band sports an official newsletter entitled Espirit De Corps that generally publishes two articles a year.

History
The band was founded in 1964 by Captain James Donald Carson (1935–2008) of the Royal New Zealand Infantry Regiment. At the time of its establishment, the number of army bands was reduced to seven, with the intention being that New Zealand Army Band would compensate that with a central band to represent the branch at all events. Its conception was based around the fact that it was the first professional band in the New Zealand Military Forces. From 1965–1988, members of the Army Band were posted on a two-year cycle with the Band of the 1st Battalion, Royal New Zealand Infantry Regiment, based originally at Terendak Camp in Malaysia. These biannual postings continued until December 1988, when the regimental band was disestablished and members returned to the New Zealand Army Band. In 2012, it was one of three bands spared in the government cutback on military bands.

Marching displays
Noted military tattoos has had the band travelling to Bremen, Germany; Basel, Switzerland; Nanchang, China; Wonju, South Korea and Edinburgh, Scotland. During its visit to Scotland in 2018 for the Edinburgh Military Tattoo, the band was presented with the Pooley Sword after it was considered to be the greatest act of that year's show by other bands and the audience. The band's first performance was a concert in Auckland in 1964. The Army Band celebrated its 20th anniversary in 1984 with an American-style Big Band march down Queen Street. In August 1979, the band performed at the wedding services for their director Roger C. Carter.

The drum major of the band uses a tewhatewha, a long-handled Māori club weapon in the shape of an axe, instead of a mace to give direction and keep time. More recently, a Haka display group was attached to the band.

Small ensembles
The Swing Band
Dance Band
Jazz Combo
Brass Quintet
The Bavarian Band

Quick marches

Leadership
The current senior appointments within the band are:

 Director of Music – Major Graham Hickman DSD, FTCL, LTCL(T), Dip Man, Dip Applied Man, AIRMTNZ, AIMNZ.
 Bandmaster – Staff Sergeant Philip Johnston FTCL
 Drum Major – Staff Sergeant Patrick McCarthy ATCL, LTCL
 Senior Instructor, School Of Music – Staff Sergeant Nick Johnson MA, PGCE, LRSM, LTCL, ALCM.
 Senior Staff Composer/Arranger - Sergeant Riwai Hina

Honours
Captain James Donald Carson was named in the 1974 Queen's Birthday Honours, where he was appointed a Member of the Order of the British Empire, and in 1977 he was awarded the Queen Elizabeth II Silver Jubilee Medal. The longest serving member of the band, WO1 Graeme Alexander Bremner (enlisted in 1965) was awarded the New Zealand Distinguished Service Decoration in the 2014 New Year Honours. In 2017, Major Graham Ross Hickman of the band was similarly awarded in the 2017 New Year Honours, for services to the New Zealand Defence Force and brass bands.

Discography
The band has released the following CDs:

On Parade (1974)
Entertainers Supreme (1976)
Brass To Go (1977)
Brass On The March (1979)
Chips And Other Tasty Goodies (1981)
Royal Wedding (1981) - AUS #49
Conflict - Tunes Of Glory (1981)
Chameleon (1999)
An Album Of Two Halves (2001)

Gallery

See also

List of military units based in or affiliated with the South Island
Band of the Royal Regiment of New Zealand Artillery
Royal New Zealand Air Force Band
Royal New Zealand Navy Band
Nelson Garrison Band

References

Military bands of New Zealand
Musical groups from Wellington
New Zealand Army
1964 establishments in New Zealand